Save Me the Waltz is a 1932 novel by American writer Zelda Sayre Fitzgerald. It is a semi-autobiographical account of her early life in the American South during the Jim Crow era and her tempestuous marriage to novelist F. Scott Fitzgerald. She composed the work while a patient at Johns Hopkins Hospital's Phipps Clinic in Baltimore, Maryland. As part of her recovery routine, she spent at least two hours a day writing a novel. She sent the manuscript to her husband's editor, Maxwell Perkins. Although unimpressed by the manuscript, Perkins published the work in order for Fitzgerald to repay his financial debt to his publisher Scribner's.

Divided into four chapters, the novel is a chronological narrative of four periods in the lives of Alabama Beggs and her alcoholic husband David Knight, two Jazz Age hedonists who are thinly-disguised alter-egos of their real-life counterparts. As her marriage deteriorates, Alabama grows further apart from her husband and their daughter. Determined to be famous, an aging Alabama aspires to become a renowned prima ballerina and devotes herself relentlessly to this ambition. However, a blister soon becomes infected from the glue in the box of her pointe shoe, leading to blood poisoning, and Alabama can never dance again.

Upon its publication by Scribner's, the novel received generally negative reviews. The book sold approximately 1,300 copies for which Zelda earned a grand total of $120.73. Its critical and commercial failure greatly disappointed Zelda and led her to pursue her other interests as a playwright and a painter. However, Broadway producers declined to produce her play, and when her paintings were exhibited in 1934, the critical response was equally disappointing.

Forty years after its publication, Zelda's biographer Nancy Milford speculated in 1970 that F. Scott Fitzgerald extensively rewrote Zelda's novel prior to publication. This supposition was echoed by later biographers. However, scholarly examinations of Zelda's earlier drafts of Save Me the Waltz and the published version disproved this speculation. Nearly every revision was by Zelda and, contrary to Milford's biography, her husband did not rewrite the manuscript.

Background 

In Winter 1929, Zelda Fitzgerald's mental health abruptly deteriorated. During an automobile trip to Paris along the mountainous roads of the Grande Corniche, Zelda seized the car's steering wheel and tried to kill herself, her husband F. Scott Fitzgerald, and their 9-year-old daughter Scottie by driving over a cliff.

After this homicidal incident, Zelda sought psychiatric treatment, and doctors diagnosed her with schizophrenia in June 1930. Zelda's biographer, Nancy Milford, quotes Dr. Oscar Forel's contemporary psychiatric diagnosis: "The more I saw Zelda, the more I thought at the time [that] she is neither [suffering from] a pure neurosis nor a real psychosis—I considered her a constitutional, emotionally unbalanced psychopath—she may improve, [but] never completely recover." The couple traveled to Switzerland where Zelda underwent further treatment at a clinic.

By Spring 1932, Zelda Fitzgerald had been a recurrent patient of several psychiatric institutions. After an episode of hysteria, Zelda insisted that she be readmitted to a mental hospital. Over her husband's objections, Zelda was admitted to the Phipps Clinic at Johns Hopkins Hospital in Baltimore on February 12, 1932. Her treatment was overseen by Dr. Adolf Meyer, an expert on schizophrenia. As part of her recovery routine, she spent at least two hours a day writing a novel.

At Phipps Clinic, Zelda developed a bond with Dr. Mildred Squires, a female resident. Toward the end of February, she shared fragments of her inchoate novel with Squires, who wrote to Scott that the unfinished novel was vivid and had charm.  Zelda wrote to Scott from the hospital, "I am proud of my novel, but I can hardly restrain myself enough to get it written. You will like it—It is distinctly École Fitzgerald, though more ecstatic than yours—perhaps too much so." Zelda wrote diligently each day and finished the novel on March 9. She sent the unaltered manuscript to Scott's gifted editor, Maxwell Perkins, at Scribner's. 

Surprised to receive an unannounced novel in the mail from Zelda, Perkins carefully perused the original and unaltered manuscript. He concluded the work had "a slightly deranged quality which gave him the impression that the author had difficulty in separating fiction from reality." Nevertheless, he felt the manuscript contained several good sections, but its overall tone seemed hopelessly "dated" and hearkened back to the glamorous Jazz Age hedonism recounted in Fitzgerald's 1922 work, The Beautiful and Damned. Perkins hoped that her husband might be able to improve its overall quality with his criticism.

Upon learning that Zelda had submitted her manuscript to Perkins, Scott became perturbed that she had not shown her manuscript to him beforehand. After reading the manuscript, he objected to her novel's plagiarism of the character of Amory Blaine, the protagonist in his first novel This Side of Paradise. He was further surprised to learn that Zelda's novel used the very same plot elements as his upcoming novel, Tender Is the Night.

After receiving letters from Scott delineating these objections, Zelda wrote to Scott apologetically that she was "afraid we might have touched the same material." Despite Scott's initial annoyance, a debt-ridden Fitzgerald realized that Zelda's book might earn a tidy profit. Consequently, his requested revisions were "relatively few," and "the disagreement was quickly resolved, with Scott recommending the novel to Perkins." Several weeks later, Scott wrote enthusiastically to Perkins: 

Although unimpressed by the manuscript, Perkins nonetheless agreed to publish the work regardless as a way for Fitzgerald to repay his considerable financial debt to Scribner's. Perkins arranged for half of Zelda's book royalties to be applied against Scott's debt to Scribner's until at least $5,000 had been repaid. 

On June 14, 1932, Zelda signed the contract with Scribner's to publish the book. It was published on October 7 with a printing of 3,010 copies—not unusually low for a first novel in the middle of the Great Depression—on cheap paper, with a cover of green linen. According to Zelda, the book derived its title from a Victor record catalog, and the title evokes the romantic glitter of the lifestyle which F. Scott Fitzgerald and herself experienced during the riotous Jazz Age of American history.

Plot summary 

Alabama Beggs, a vivacious Southern belle who "wanted her own way about things", comes of age in the Deep South during the Jim Crow era. She marries David Knight, a 22-year-old Yankee artist of Irish Catholic stock. Alabama met David when he was a United States Army officer stationed near her Southern town during World War I. Knight becomes a successful painter, and the family moves to the French Riviera where Alabama has a romance with a handsome French aviator named Jacques Chevre-Feuille. In retaliation, David abandons her at a dinner party and spends the night with a dancer.

Alabama grows further apart from her husband and their daughter. Determined to be famous, an aging Alabama aspires to become a renowned prima ballerina and devotes herself relentlessly to this ambition. She is offered an opportunity to dance featured parts with a prestigious company in Naples—and she takes it, and goes to live in the city alone. Alabama dances her solo debut in the opera Faust. However, a blister soon becomes infected from the glue in the box of her pointe shoe, leading to blood poisoning, and Alabama can never dance again. Though outwardly successful, Alabama and David are miserable. 

At the novel's end, the unhappy couple returns to the Deep South during the Great Depression where Alabama's father is dying. She searches for meaning in her father's death, but finds none. Though she says otherwise, her childhood friends assume she must be happy, and they envy her privileged lifestyle as the wife of a famous artist. The last paragraph depicts the unhappy Knights immobile and dissipated as a couple:

Critical reception 

The reviews by literary critics were mostly negative. The critics savaged Zelda's prose as overwritten, attacked her characters as weak and uninteresting, and declared her tragic scenes to be grotesquely "harlequinade". The New York Times review was particularly harsh and lambasted her editor Max Perkins: 

The overwhelmingly negative reviews bewildered and distressed Zelda. However, she acknowledged to Maxwell Perkins that a review from William McFee, writing in The New York Sun, was at least accurate in its criticisms. McFee wrote: 

Malcolm Cowley, a friend of the Fitzgeralds, read the book and wrote consolingly to her husband Scott, "It moves me a lot: she has something there that nobody got into words before." Yet another friend, Ernest Hemingway, believed the work lacked artistic merit and warned editor Maxwell Perkins that if he ever published a novel by any of his wives, "I'll bloody well shoot you." Perkins himself was somewhat dismissive of the novel's quality. The book sold approximately 1,300 copies for which Zelda earned a final sum of $120.73.

After the failure of Save Me the Waltz, Zelda's spirits were temporarily crushed. She nevertheless attempted to write a farcical stage play entitled Scandalabra in Fall 1932. However, after submitting the manuscript to agent Harold Ober, Zelda was further dispirited when Broadway producers rejected her play. A year later, during a group therapy session with her husband and a psychiatrist, Fitzgerald remarked that she was "a third-rate writer." Disheartened, Zelda next attempted to paint watercolors but, when her paintings were exhibited in 1934, the critical response was equally disappointing.

In 1965, nearly two decades after Zelda's death, her friend and literary critic Edmund Wilson cautioned that readers should not infer too much about the Fitzgeralds' supposedly glamorous existence based on Save Me the Waltz as the semi-fictional novel "was merely a reflection of the fantasy that he and she lived together". Wilson stated that Morley Callaghan's 1963 memoir That Summer in Paris, which recounted Callaghan's friendship with the Fitzgeralds during their sojourn abroad, provided a more accurate representation of the daily lives of Zelda and her husband in Europe.

Authorship 
In 1970, forty years after the novel's original publication, Zelda's first biographer Nancy Milford posited that novelist F. Scott Fitzgerald had extensively rewritten his spouse's manuscript prior to its publication. Contrary to this speculation, later scholarly examinations of Zelda's earlier drafts of Save Me the Waltz and the revised version of her novel discerned fewer alterations than previously assumed. 

According to Fitzgerald scholar Matthew J. Bruccoli, the revised galleys were "worked over, but almost all the marks are in Zelda Fitzgerald's hand. F. Scott Fitzgerald did not systematically work on the surviving proofs: only eight of the words written on them are clearly in his hand." Furthermore, the revisions requested by Fitzgerald were determined to be relatively minor.

References

Notes

Citations

Works cited 

 
 
 
 
 
 
 
 
 
 
 
 
 
 
 
 
 

1932 American novels
Adultery in novels
Metafictional novels
Modernist novels
Charles Scribner's Sons books
Novels set in the Roaring Twenties
Novels set in New York City
Novels set in France